Mastixia rostrata subsp. caudatifolia is a subspecies of Mastixia rostrata. It is a tree in the family Nyssaceae. The infraspecific epithet  is from the Latin meaning "tapered leaf".

Description
The generally smooth bark is greyish to brown. The flowers are green-yellow.

Distribution and habitat
Mastixia rostrata subsp. caudatifolia grows naturally in Sumatra, Peninsular Malaysia and Borneo. Its habitat is mixed dipterocarp forest from sea-level to  altitude.

References

rostrata subsp. caudatifolia
Trees of Sumatra
Trees of Peninsular Malaysia
Trees of Borneo
Plant subspecies
Plants described in 1976